The Sukhothai script, also known as the proto-Thai script and Ram Khamhaeng alphabet, is a Brahmic script which originated in the Sukhothai Kingdom. The script is found on the Ram Khamhaeng Inscription and the Lö Thai inscription.

History

Origin
The source of the Sukhothai script was cursive Khmer letters, which were formed by dissections, truncations and removal of flourishes from the original Khmer script. Scholar Michel Ferlus has demonstrated that certain peculiarities of ancient and modern Tai scripts can only be explained by inadequacies and gaps in the ancient Khmer script, in particular the pre-Angkorian Khmer script. The Sukhothai script is first attested on the Ram Khamhaeng stele, which is dated between 1283 and 1290, but it is the result of the modification of an unattested pre-existing script, based on the Khmer script. Ferlus theorizes that the pre-existing script may have developed during the pre-Angkorian period (7th-8th centuries), which would be about four centuries earlier than current certainties. However, another possibility is that a pre-Angkorian version of Khmer script may have lasted for some time on the outskirts of Khmer civilization. This first Tai script must have had the same shortcomings as the Khmer script, but the Tai introduced innovations such as the adaptation or modification of letters to create new letters for sounds that were unrepresented by the Khmer script. According to Thai tradition the Sukhothai script was created in 1283 by King Ramkhamhaeng the Great.

Ferlus divides the Tai scripts of Khmer origin into two groups: the central scripts, consisting of ancient (Sukhothai, Fakkham) and modern (Thai, Lao) scripts, and the peripheral scripts of the Tai of Vietnam (Tai Dam, Tai Don, Tai Daeng, Tai Yo and Lai Pao script. Ferlus suggest that the Tai peoples all adopted the same first model of writing borrowed from the Khmers, by simple contact during exchanges, without proper learning. Subsequently, the Tai migrated and occupied a large part of Southeast Asia. The Tai that headed south (becoming known as the Thais or Siamese), slipped within the borders of the Angkorian domain, where they founded the Sukhothai Kingdom. The primitive Tai script was Khmerized during this new contact with the Khmers, resulting in the Sukhothai script. Features like alphabetical order and numerals were borrowed from the Khmer script. Certain vowel symbols changed value so that there is no reading contradiction between the Thai and Khmer languages. The peripheral scripts still retain many characteristics of the primitive script, such as pre-Angkorian sound values of certain letters, a lack of alphabetical order and a lack of numerals. According to Anthony Diller, the innovations found in the Sukhothai script as compared to the Khmer script, indicate that the script was a planned and unified system.

Spread and descendants
After its creation, the Sukhothai script spread to the Tai kingdoms of Lan Chang (Laos), Lan Na and Ayutthaya. The oldest Sukhothai inscription found at Lampang (Lan Na) is almost identical to the earliest ones found at Sukhothai. The inscription originated in Lamphun, but was drawn by a Sukhothai monk, who probably introduced the Suhkhothai script to Lan Na. The script transformed somewhat over time as it spread throughout the region to the north and south. According to Finot (1959), the earliest example of the Sukhothai script found in Luang Prabang dates from 1548 A.D., 265 years after the Ram Khamhaeng inscription.

The Sukhothai script changed little as it spread southward, as today's modern Thai script has changed remarkably little from the Sukhothai script. The Sukhothai script developed into the Thai script in the lower basin of the Chao Phraya River, as this development can be traced over the course of the following centuries. During King Lithai's reign in the late 14th century, literate individuals were still familiar with the Khmer script and therefore refused to write in the Sukhothai script. To address this, the script was modified to more closely resemble the Khmer script in the way vowels are written. The changes that were introduced resulted in a new script in 1375, called the "King Li Thai script". This script wrote vowel signs above, below, before or after an initial consonant. In 1680 this script was succeeded by the "King Narai script", which has been developed and preserved as the modern Thai script of today.

In the north, the script changed more considerably as it evolved into the Fakkham script. The Fakkham script was used extensively in the Lan Na Kingdom between the beginning of the 15th century and the end of the 16th century. The letters of the Fakkham script became elongated and somewhat more angular rather than square and perpendicular as its ancestor the Sukhothai script. Several letters had noticeable "tails" extending above and below the main writing line.

Characteristics
The Sukhothai script was written from left to right. The script did not employ wordspacing, capitalization or full stops at the end of sentences. The script had 39 consonant symbols. The Sukhothai script introduced four innovations compared to the Khmer script. The first innovation is the introduction of several new letters to accommodate Tai phonemic contrasts not made by the Khmer script. These include /e/ and /ae/, /pʰ/ and /f/, and /kʰ/ and /x/. The new letters were created by modifying letters used for similar sounds, by adding for example tails or indentations to the letters. The Sukhothai script is considered to be the first script in the world that introduced tone markers to indicate distinctive tones, which are lacking in the Mon-Khmer (Austroasiatic languages) and Indo-Aryan languages that used scripts ancestral to Sukhothai. Another addition were consonant clusters that were written horizontally and contiguously on one line, rather than writing the second consonant below the first one. Finally, the script wrote vowel marks on the main line, however this innovation fell out of use not long after. By the fifteenth century, several vowel diacritics were added to the earlier Sukhothai script as found in the Ram Khamhaeng inscription, in order to write all vowels, some of which were treated as inherent vowels in the earlier script, with distinct signs.

References

External links
 Sukhothai script letter charts
 Sukhothai script at Omniglot

Brahmic scripts
Obsolete writing systems
Sukhothai Kingdom
Inscriptions of Thailand